The Turin–Fossano–Savona railway is a major Italian railway that links the cities of Turin and Savona. The railway is double track up to Ceva, standard gauge and fully electrified at 3 kV DC. It connects the cities of Trofarello, Carmagnola, Cavallermaggiore, Savigliano, Fossano, Mondovì, Ceva and San Giuseppe di Cairo.

History
The railway was opened from 1829 to 1954.

See also 
 List of railway lines in Italy

References

Bibliography 
 RFI - Fascicolo Linea 8 (Torino–San Giuseppe di Cairo)
 RFI - Fascicolo Linea 75 (San Giuseppe di Cairo–Savona)
 Franco Dell'Amico, Due valichi per Savona, in "I Treni Oggi" n. 61 (giugno 1986), pp. 16–22.
 Rebagliati Franco, Dell'Amico Franco, Siri Mario, I centoventi anni della linea ferroviaria Torino-Savona (1874-1994), Alzani Editore

External links 

Railway lines in Piedmont
Railway lines in Liguria
Railway lines opened in 1823
1823 establishments in Italy